Floraville is a suburb of the City of Lake Macquarie in New South Wales, Australia  from Newcastle's central business district on the eastern side of Lake Macquarie and north of the town of Belmont.

History
The land was subdivided in the 1920s along with Belmont North and Jewells, but wasn't developed until the 1960s. A sizeable chunk of the eastern section of the suburb is owned by the Gatt family but their parcel of farmland has slowly been reduced through residential expansion.

It has a primary school, which opened in 1967 and houses approximately 550 students.

References

External links
 History of Floraville (Lake Macquarie City Library)

Suburbs of Lake Macquarie